The large niltava (Niltava grandis) is a species of bird in the family Muscicapidae. It is found in Bangladesh, Bhutan, Cambodia, China, India, Indonesia, Laos, Malaysia, Myanmar, Nepal, Thailand, and Vietnam. Its natural habitat is subtropical or tropical montane forests.

Gallery

References

External links

Image at ADW

large niltava
Birds of Bangladesh
Birds of Eastern Himalaya
Birds of Southeast Asia
large niltava
large niltava
Articles containing video clips
Taxonomy articles created by Polbot